Jefferson G. Griffin (born October 7, 1980) is a judge of the North Carolina Court of Appeals.

Griffin grew up in Red Oak, North Carolina and graduated from the University of North Carolina at Chapel Hill and the North Carolina Central University School of Law. He was appointed by North Carolina Governor Pat McCrory to be a District Court Judge in Wake County in 2015. Judge Griffin was elected to a four-year term in the 2016 general election to retain his seat. He served there until his election to the North Carolina Court of Appeals in 2020. On January 5, 2023, he declared his intentions to run for the North Carolina Supreme Court in the 2024 elections. 

Judge Griffin also serves as a Captain in the North Carolina Army National Guard.

References

North Carolina Court of Appeals judges
University of North Carolina at Chapel Hill alumni
Living people
North Carolina National Guard personnel
North Carolina Republicans
21st-century American judges
Year of birth missing (living people)